FOW, FoW, or Fow may refer to:

 Forge welding
 Future of Wrestling, an American wrestling promotion
John Robert Fow (1869–1943), New Zealand politician

Gaming 
Flames of War, a miniatures wargame

See also 

 Faces of War, a video game
 Force of Will, a trading card game
 Fog of war, the concept of uncertainty in warfare